Tom Wilson (born 1980) is a British filmmaker based in Romania. He directed The București Experiment, winner of the 2013 Gopo Award for Best Long Documentary. He also directed the 2011 short film Before the Fall and the 2016 short film Law 107.
In addition, he has worked as a journalist for outlets including the BBC, The Guardian and Deutsche Welle.

References

1980 births
Living people